Fox Park is a census-designated place (CDP) in Albany County, Wyoming, United States. The population was 22 at the 2010 census.

Geography
According to the United States Census Bureau, the CDP has a total area of 1.0 square mile (28.5 km), all land.

The CDP is located entirely within the Medicine Bow National Forest.

Fox Park experiences a subarctic climate (Köppen climate classification Dfc) due to its elevation. Winters are long and cold, with highs usually remaining at or below freezing, and lows often dropping below zero. Summers are refreshingly warm, but with lows still dropping to freezing. Snowfall is very heavy, averaging 180 inches per year, mostly falling between October and May, but snow during the months of September and June is not rare, and usually happens every couple of years. Usually no month of the year is frost free. Fox Park is the highest community in the state of Wyoming, at an elevation of 9,062 ft, as well as one of the coldest settlements.

Education
Public education in the community of Fox Park is provided by Albany County School District #1.

References

Census-designated places in Albany County, Wyoming
Census-designated places in Wyoming